Hunsrück-Mittelrhein is a Verbandsgemeinde ("collective municipality") in the Rhein-Hunsrück-Kreis, Rhineland-Palatinate, Germany. The seat of the Verbandsgemeinde is in Emmelshausen. It was formed on 1 January 2020 by the merger of the former Verbandsgemeinden Emmelshausen and Sankt Goar-Oberwesel.

The Verbandsgemeinde Hunsrück-Mittelrhein consists of the following Ortsgemeinden ("local municipalities"):

Badenhard
Beulich
Bickenbach
Birkheim
Damscheid
Dörth
Emmelshausen
Gondershausen
Halsenbach
Hausbay
Hungenroth
Karbach
Kratzenburg
Laudert
Leiningen
Lingerhahn
Maisborn
Mermuth
Morshausen
Mühlpfad
Ney
Niederburg
Niedert
Norath
Oberwesel
Perscheid
Pfalzfeld
Sankt Goar
Schwall
Thörlingen
Urbar
Utzenhain
Wiebelsheim

Verbandsgemeinde in Rhineland-Palatinate